Labidostommatidae is a family of acariform mites. These egg-shaped free-living predators have the body completely covered with sclerotized plates, often with a reticulated pattern, two or three eyes and two claws on each tarsus.

Genera
BioLib includes:
 Cornutella?
 Eunicolina Berlese, 1911
 Labidostomma Kramer, 1879

References
Partial species list

External links

Trombidiformes
Acari families
Taxa named by Anthonie Cornelis Oudemans